Sir Peter Burrell, 1st Baron Gwydyr PC (16 June 1754 – 29 June 1820) featured in English politics at the end of the 18th century, but he was best known for his involvement in cricket, particularly his part in the foundation of Marylebone Cricket Club in 1787.

He was the son of Peter Burrell and educated at Eton College and St John's College, Cambridge.

Career
He was elected Member of Parliament for Haslemere from 1776 to 1780 and for Boston from 1782 to 1796.

He married in 1779, Lady Priscilla Barbara Elizabeth Bertie, the daughter of Peregrine Bertie, 3rd Duke of Ancaster and Kesteven. She succeeded to a large part of the Ancaster estates in 1779, to the barony of Willoughby of Eresby in 1780 and to the hereditary office of Lord Great Chamberlain. Burrell was knighted in 1781 and became her deputy.

The highlight of his career was his role as Deputy Lord Great Chamberlain, jure uxoris, in the famous trial of Warren Hastings. Hastings had been the first Governor-General of India from 1773 to 1786, but in 1787 he was impeached and subsequently tried for corruption, but was acquitted in 1795.

He succeeded his father in 1775 and his great-uncle, Sir Merrik Burrell, as 2nd Baronet in 1787. He was created Baron Gwydir on 16 June 1796.

Cricket
A keen amateur cricketer, Burrell has been called the third most influential member of the White Conduit Club and of the early MCC, after George Finch, 9th Earl of Winchilsea and Charles Lennox, 4th Duke of Richmond. he played in seven matches which have been awarded first-class cricket status between 1787 and 1790. In a non-first-class match for White Conduit Club against the Gentlemen of Kent at White Conduit Fields in 1785 he scored 97 runs in an innings.

Family
He died in 1820. With Priscilla Bertie he had lived at Langley Park, Beckenham and had three sons and a daughter. He was succeeded in his titles by his eldest son, Peter Robert Drummond-Burrell, 2nd Baron Gwydyr, 22nd Baron Willoughby de Eresby.

References

1754 births
1820 deaths
People educated at Eton College
Alumni of St John's College, Cambridge
Peter
Peter
Peers of Great Britain created by George III
English cricketers of 1701 to 1786
English cricketers of 1787 to 1825
English knights
Kent cricketers
Knights Bachelor
Members of the Parliament of Great Britain for English constituencies
Members of the Privy Council of the United Kingdom
English cricketers
Marylebone Cricket Club cricketers
British MPs 1774–1780
British MPs 1780–1784
British MPs 1784–1790
British MPs 1790–1796
White Conduit Club cricketers
Non-international England cricketers
Cricket patrons